Voorne aan Zee is a municipality on the island of Voorne-Putten in the western Netherlands, in the province of South Holland.

The municipality of Voorne aan Zee was formed on 1 January 2023, through the merger of the former municipalities of Brielle, Hellevoetsluis and Westvoorne, which itself was formed on 1 January 1980, through the merger of the former municipalities Oostvoorne and Rockanje.

It consists of the population centres of Brielle, Hellevoetsluis, Oostvoorne, Oudenhoorn, Rockanje, Nieuw-Helvoet, Nieuwenhoorn, Oude en Nieuwe Struiten, Vierpolders, Zwartewaal, Tinte and Helhoek.

Notable people 
 Jacob van Maerlant (ca.1230–40 – ca.1288–1300), a Flemish poet of the 13th century, an important Middle Dutch author of the Middle Ages
 Maarten Tromp (1598 in Brielle – 1653), a Dutch army general and admiral in the Dutch navy
 Witte de With  (1599 in Hoogendijk – 1658), a Dutch naval officer during the Eighty Years War and the First Anglo-Dutch war
 Volkert Simon Maarten van der Willigen (1822–1878), a Dutch mathematician, physicist and professor
 Jan Greshoff (1888 in Nieuw-Helvoet – 1971), a Dutch journalist, poet, and literary critic
 Belinda Meuldijk (born 1955), a Dutch actress, writer, and activist 
 Meindert van Buuren (born 1995), a Dutch racing driver

Gallery

References

External links
Official website

 
Voorne-Putten
Municipalities of South Holland
Municipalities of the Netherlands established in 2023